William Murray Smith (23 October 1930 – 1 October 2010) was a Progressive Conservative party member of the House of Commons of Canada. He was born at Cardale, Manitoba and became a barrister by career.

After an unsuccessful attempt in the 1957 election, Smith was elected at the Winnipeg North riding in the 1958 general election and served one term, the 24th Canadian Parliament, before his defeat at Winnipeg North in the 1962 election. He was also unsuccessful in his campaign at Winnipeg North Centre in the 1974 election.

During the 1990s, Murray Smith became a key player in Royal Club International and then Chateau World where he was named as the President of that corporation.

Smith died at the Agape Hospice in Calgary from cancer, aged 79.

References

External links
 

1930 births
2010 deaths
Members of the House of Commons of Canada from Manitoba
Progressive Conservative Party of Canada MPs
Deaths from cancer in Alberta